Taeniotes boliviensis is a species of beetle in the family Cerambycidae. It was described by Dillon and Dillon in 1941. It is known from Argentina, Ecuador and Bolivia.

References

boliviensis
Beetles described in 1941